Arkeology is the study of the story of Noah's Ark and the searches for physical evidence which would corroborate it.
It may also refer to:

 Arkeology (The Ark album), 2011
 Arkeology (World Party album), 2012
 Arkology (album), 1997 album released by Lee "Scratch" Perry
 Arcology, a proposed type of massive habitation building